The 2015 Porsche Carrera Cup Italia season was the ninth Porsche Carrera Cup Italy season. It began on 30 May at Monza and finished on 18 October in Mugello, after seven events with two races at each event, except for the Spa-Francorchamps round. Riccardo Agostini won the drivers' championship driving for Antonelli Motorsport - Centro Porsche Padova, and Tsunami Racing Team won the teams' championship

Teams and drivers

Race calendar and results

Championship standings

Drivers' Championship

† - Drivers did not finish the race, but were classified as they completed over 75% of the race distance.

   - the Spa-Francorchamps round assigned 20 points to all the participants, with points per placement assigned on race 2 point system basis.
   - Stefano Colombo was awarded the points for pole position and for the fastest lap because Mathieu Jaminet and Steven Palette were ineligible to score points.

Teams' Championship

† - Drivers did not finish the race, but were classified as they completed over 90% of the race distance.

Michelin Cup
The Michelin Cup is the trophy reserved to the gentlemen drivers.

Porsche Carrera Cup Italia Scholarship Programme
The Scholarship Programme Cup is the trophy reserved to the under-26 drivers elected by Porsche at the beginning of the season.

References

External links
 

Porsche Carrera Cup Italy seasons
Porsche Carrera Cup Italy